John Carey (April 5, 1792 – March 17, 1875) was a U.S. Representative from Ohio for one term from 1859 to 1861.

Biography
Born in Monongalia County, Virginia (now West Virginia), Carey moved with his parents to the Northwest Territory in 1798.
He served under General William Hull in the War of 1812.
He served as associate judge 1825–1832.
He was appointed Indian agent at the Wyandotte Reservation in 1829.
He served as member of the Ohio House of Representatives in 1828, 1836, and 1843.
Presidential elector in 1840 for Harrison/Tyler.
Promoter and first president of the Mad River and Lake Erie Railroad, from Sandusky to Dayton, about 1845. He is the namesake of the town of Carey, Ohio.

Carey was elected as a Republican to the Thirty-sixth Congress (March 4, 1859 – March 3, 1861).
He died in Carey, Ohio, March 17, 1875.
He was interred in the family burial ground on the home farm.
He was reinterred in 1919 in Spring Grove Cemetery, Carey, Ohio.

Family
John Carey was the second son and third child of Stephen Brown Carey and Sarah Mitten Carey. He married Dorcas Wilcox (1790-1867), of Worthington, Ohio, on January 9, 1817. She was a native of Connecticut. They had six children named Napoleon Bonaparte Carey (1818-1846), MacDonnough Monroe Carey (1820-1895), Emma Marie Carey (1822-1842), Eliza Anne Carey Kinney (1824-1904), Cinderella Carey Brown (1826-1892), and Dorcas Carey Dow (1830-1909).

Notes

References

1792 births
1875 deaths
Members of the United States House of Representatives from Ohio
People from Wyandot County, Ohio
Members of the Ohio House of Representatives
1840 United States presidential electors
Ohio Whigs
19th-century American politicians
People from Crawford County, Ohio
American military personnel of the War of 1812
People from Monongalia County, West Virginia
Ohio Republicans
Republican Party members of the United States House of Representatives
People from Carey, Ohio